The 1976–77 season was Liverpool Football Club's 85th season in existence and their 15th consecutive season in the First Division. Liverpool won their tenth Football League title after winning it for the second successive season, but lost out to Manchester United in the FA Cup final, their defeat preventing them from becoming the first English club to win three major trophies in the same season.

However, four days after their defeat in the FA Cup final, the club won the European Cup for the first time, beating Borussia Mönchengladbach 3–1 at the Olympic Stadium in Rome. In doing so, they became the second English and the third British club to win the trophy.	

This was not only the final season, but the final game for Kevin Keegan before he moved to Hamburg for a British record transfer fee of £500,000.

One transfer that passed almost unnoticed as Liverpool were going for the treble, was the signing of Alan Hansen from Partick Thistle for £100,000.

Squad

Goalkeepers
  Ray Clemence
  Peter McDonnell

Defenders
  Emlyn Hughes
  Joey Jones
  Brian Kettle
  Alec Lindsay
  Phil Neal
  Tommy Smith
  Phil Thompson

Midfielders
  Ian Callaghan
  Jimmy Case
  Steve Heighway
  Sammy Lee
  Ray Kennedy
  Terry McDermott
  Peter Cormack

Attackers
  David Fairclough
  Kevin Keegan
  Kevin Kewley
  John Toshack
  Alan Waddle
  David Johnson

First Division

Table

Matches

1976 FA Charity Shield

Football League Cup

FA Cup

Final

European Cup

Final

References

 LFC History.net – 1976–77 season
 Liverweb - 1976-77 Season

Liverpool F.C. seasons
Liverpool
UEFA Champions League-winning seasons
English football championship-winning seasons